Rumbelows was an electrical and electronics retailer in the United Kingdom that once rivalled Currys, Dixons and Comet.

History
The company was established by Fred Dawes as a chain of television and radio rental shops in the 1950s, and named after him. The stores became more general electrical retailers. The chain was later acquired by Thorn Electrical Industries. In 1971, Thorn also acquired the Sidney Rumbelows chain, and Fred Dawes stores were subsequently renamed Rumbelows. Several other regional chains were bought around this time, including two chains in North West England, NEMS and Strothers. As with Fred Dawes, these stores were renamed Rumbelows. Centralised control was established from the Nantwich, Cheshire, headquarters. 

Several of the former Strothers and NEMS stores also sold records, musical instruments and hifi equipment. The Rumbelows store in Whitechapel, Liverpool had previously been the NEMS music store in the 1960s, when it was run by Brian Epstein, manager of the Beatles.

Demise
In 1989, the business was sold to Radio Rentals, which had merged with Thorn Electrical Industries the previous year, and all the rental accounts were transferred to Radio Rentals. Thorn EMI (as Thorn Electrical Industries had become) transferred all of Rumbelows’ rental accounts to their Radio Rentals chain, bolstering its market position. With its core business removed, Rumbelows sought a new identity as a more conventional (non-rental) retailer, even adding computers to the product mix.

In 1992, Thorn converted some of the remaining Rumbelows shops into DER, Multibroadcast or Radio Rentals branches. Some stores were also converted to the Fona brand, franchised from a Danish electrical retailer and marketed as "The electrical store from Denmark", with adverts starring Britt Ekland.

By the 1990s, the business was making losses and Thorn closed the remaining 285 Rumbelows shops and 36 Fona stores in 1995. Rumbelows had been losing £12 million yearly, and had never made a profit in its 24 years of existence. Some stores were sold to Escom, a German PC retail chain, but itself folded in 1998. In the 1980s, Martin Dawes (born c. 1945) would carry on the family name in the electrical and electronic retailing sector, with his mobile phone business, which he then sold to Cellnet in March 1999 for £130 million.

Football sponsorship
From 1990 to 1992, Rumbelows were the title sponsor of the English Football League Cup, an association football professional competition.

References

Consumer electronics retailers of the United Kingdom
Retail companies established in 1969
Retail companies disestablished in 1995
Defunct retail companies of the United Kingdom
British companies disestablished in 1995